UNO-96 Alliance, was a center-right Nicaraguan political party founded in 1996 by Alfredo César Aguirre, member of the National Opposition Union and campaign advisor to former president Violeta Barrios de Chamorro. The UNO-96 alliance obtained a seat in the National Assembly in the 1996 Nicaraguan general elections.

References

1996 establishments in Nicaragua
Defunct political parties in Nicaragua
Political parties established in 1996
Political parties with year of disestablishment missing